Dutch Cemetery is a heritage Christian cemetery at Kalikapur in the Berhampore CD block in the Berhampore subdivision of Murshidabad district, West Bengal, India.

History
In its hey days Murshidabad was an active trading post that not only attracted the British but also the Dutch and the Armenians, all of whom settled here in different times. The Dutch Cemetery has “47 tombs and obelisks etc. and the oldest being that of Daniel Van der Muyl who died in 1721 AD.”  The Babulbona Residency Cemetery, as also the British and Dutch cemeteries in neighbouring Cossimbazar are not really in ship shape, although they are state protected monuments.

According to the Archaeological Survey of India, as mentioned in the List of Monuments of National Importance in West Bengal the Dutch Cemetery is an ASI Listed Monument.

Gallery

References

External links

Cemeteries in India
Tourist attractions in Murshidabad district
Buildings and structures in Murshidabad district
18th-century establishments in India
Monuments of National Importance in West Bengal